Liston Colaço (born 12 November 1998) is an Indian professional footballer who plays as a winger for Indian Super League club ATK Mohun Bagan and the India national team.

Club career
Born in Davorlim, Goa, Colaço is a product of Salgaocar. He was the top scorer with the club's under-19 side during the 2016–17 I-League U18 with 16 goals. Colaço also played for Salgaocar's first team during the 2016–17 Goa Professional League, becoming top scorer during that tournament with 13 goals.

In March 2017, it was announced that Colaço had been selected into Goa's final squad for the 2016–17 Santosh Trophy. He began the tournament with a goal in Goa's first match against Meghalaya. Colaço scored in the 52nd minute as Goa won 2–1. He then scored a brace for Goa in the semi-finals against Kerala on 23 March 2017 which sent Goa to the final.

Goa
After his performances for Salgaocar and the Goa football team in the Santosh Trophy, Colaço joined Indian Super League side Goa for a reported 15 lakh. In October 2017, after impressing for FC Goa Development team, Colaço, along with Manvir Singh, was called up to the first team.

On 19 November 2017, Colaço made his professional debut for Goa in their opening Indian Super League match against Chennaiyin. He came on as a 79th-minute substitute for Brandon Fernandes as Goa won 3–2.

Hyderabad
On 14 January 2020, Liston joined Indian Super league side Hyderabad on a two and half year deal. On 30 January 2020, Liston made his debut for Hyderabad against Bengaluru. He came on as a 71st minute substitute for Asish Rai as the match ended in a 1–0 victory for Bengaluru. He ended up the season by scoring four goals for the club.

ATK Mohun Bagan
On 10 April 2021, it was officially announced that ATK Mohun Bagan and Hyderabad FC have agreed on the transfer of Liston Colaco,  which involves an undisclosed transfer fee around ₹1 crores. This move set a new record in Indian football for the highest transfer fee for an Indian player, breaking the previous record of transfer of Manvir Singh from FC Goa to ATK Mohun Bagan for ₹80 lakhs.

Colaco scored his first goal for the club on 21 August against Maziya S&RC at the 2021 AFC Cup. He debuted for Mohun Bagan in the 2021–22 season opener against Kerala Blasters on 19 November, where he scored a goal in 4–2 win. His goal in ATKMB's 2–1 victory over FC Goa on 29 December is recorded as one of the fastest shots in the history of the game with 181 km/h, taking the sixth spot previously held by former England national football team captain David Beckham. He had an excellent season recording 8 goals, the most by a domestic player, along with 3 assists. He was one of the standout performers of the season.

On 21 May 2022, Colaco scored a hat-trick in their 4–0 win against Bangladeshi side Bashundhara Kings at the second group-stage match of 2022 AFC Cup. He finished the tournament with four goals.

International career
In March 2021, Liston was included in the 35-member list of probables for the Indian national team's international friendlies against Oman and UAE. He made his national team debut against UAE on 29 March.

Personal life
Colaço has been in a relationship with Goan air-hostess Bryna Dsouza.

Career statistics

Club

International

Honours
FC Goa
Super Cup: 2019

India
 SAFF Championship: 2021

Individual
Mohun Bagan Footballer of the year: 2022

References

External links
 Indian Super League Profile

1998 births
Living people
People from South Goa district
Indian footballers
Salgaocar FC players
FC Goa players
Association football forwards
Footballers from Goa
Goa Professional League players
Indian Super League players
India international footballers
Hyderabad FC players
ATK Mohun Bagan FC players